John T. Murray (28 August 1886 – 12 February 1957) was an Australian stage and film actor.

Biography
Born in Melbourne in 1886, Murray was married to actress Vivien Oakland, who he had appeared with on the vaudeville stage.Who was who on the Screen, pp. 339, 348 (1977) ("Screen and vaudeville actor. Married to actress Vivian Oakland (dec. 1958) with whom he appeared in vaudeville") He died in Woodland Hills, California in 1957 from a stroke.

Selected stage appearances
 The Passing Show of 1915 (1915)
 The Show of Wonders (1917)
 The Whirl of New York (1921)
 The Yankee Princess (1922)

Partial filmography

 Sally (1925)
 Joanna (1925)
 Stop Flirting (1925)
 Wife Tamers (1926) (short)
 The Gay Old Bird (1927)
 Finger Prints (1927)
 Sonny Boy (1929)
 Honky Tonk (1929)
 Personality (1930)
 Young as You Feel (1931)
 Charlie Chan Carries On (1931)
 Alexander Hamilton (1931)
 Love Birds (1934)
 The Lady in Scarlet (1935)
 Small Town Boy (1937)
 Girl Loves Boy (1937)
 Gang Bullets (1938)
 Down on the Farm (1938)
 Quick Millions (1939)
 The Hardys Ride High (1939)

References

Bibliography
 Emily W. Leider. Myrna Loy: The Only Good Girl in Hollywood. University of California Press, 2011.

External links

Photograph at gettyimages.com

1886 births
1957 deaths
Australian male film actors
People from Melbourne
Australian emigrants to the United States